Dan Reed is a British film director whose film, In the Shadow of 9/11, about the Liberty City Seven, aired on Frontline on PBS.

Filmography
 2000: The Valley
 2003: Terror in Moscow
 2009: Terror in Mumbai
 2010: The Battle for Haiti
 2012: Children of the Tsunami
 2013: Legally High
 2014: The Paedophile Hunter
 2014: Terror at the Mall
 2015: Escorts
 2015: From Russia with Cash
 2016: 3 Days of Terror: The Charlie Hebdo Attacks
 2017: Calais, the End of the Jungle
 2019: Leaving Neverland
 2021: In the Shadow of 9/11
 2021: Four Hours at the Capitol – executive producer

References

External links

British film directors
Living people
Year of birth missing (living people)